Windhover may refer to:

Common kestrel (Falco tinnunculus), a bird of prey species
"The Windhover", a 1877 poem by Gerard Manley Hopkins
Saro Windhover, an amphibious aircraft
USS Windhover (ASR-18), a planned ship that was cancelled in 1945
Windhover (clipper ship), a tea clipper built in 1868